John Clyde Bowen (May 12, 1888 – April 27, 1978) was a United States district judge of the United States District Court for the Western District of Washington.

Education and career

Born in Newbern, Tennessee, Bowen received a Bachelor of Arts degree from the University of Tennessee in 1913 and a Bachelor of Laws from Harvard Law School in 1916. He was a Lieutenant in the United States Army F.A.R.C. during World War I from 1917 to 1918. He entered private practice in Seattle, Washington in 1919, and was a member of the Washington State Senate in 1931, and later a legal adviser to the Governor of Washington in 1933. He was a tax collector for the Internal Revenue Service for the Districts of Washington and the Territory of Alaska from 1933 to 1934.

Federal judicial service

On February 22, 1934, Bowen was nominated by President Franklin D. Roosevelt to a seat on the United States District Court for the Western District of Washington vacated by Judge Jeremiah Neterer. Bowen was confirmed by the United States Senate on February 28, 1934, and received his commission on March 20, 1934. He served as Chief Judge from 1948 to 1959. He assumed senior status on June 5, 1961. Bowen served in that capacity until his death on April 27, 1978.

References

Sources
 

1888 births
1978 deaths
University of Tennessee alumni
Harvard Law School alumni
Judges of the United States District Court for the Western District of Washington
United States district court judges appointed by Franklin D. Roosevelt
20th-century American judges
United States Army officers
People from Dyer County, Tennessee
Military personnel from Tennessee
Lawyers from Seattle
Politicians from Seattle
Washington (state) state senators